Throughout the years, Pugad Baboy creator Pol Medina has created villains and rogues to challenge his main characters, some of which were based on the scourges of the Philippine social and political environment. Sometimes they were the people within the law, like Patrolman Durugas and Senator Cabalfin. Most times they were criminals, ex-lawmen, former military and even those of supernatural origin. Here are some of the supposed villains in Medina's strips, in chronological order.

Atong Damuho (Renate Domingo) - Wisedog/Dobermaxx's arch-enemy. He started as a small-time drug-pusher. From there he graduated to other illegitimate professions selling stray dogs for Asocena (a local delicacy), drug horticulturist, illegal logger and poacher. Though he was apprehended every time, he has managed to escape prison through bribery.
Lucifer - Medina's version of Satan. To reflect the devil's ambiguous nature, he portrayed him as a homosexual (for which he calls himself "Lucy"). He appears during periods of disasters and elections, when the mortality rates rise and the trading of souls for success is high. He also appears in the online story arc, named Ang Punyal ni Devlino.
The Taokoy Tribe - A group of sea monsters encountered by the Pugad Baboy Gang during their seaside vacation. They regularly surface to find healthy human specimens for their dissection studies. "Taokoy" is a portmanteau of tao (human, pronounced "ta-o") and siokoy (a sea monster in folklore somewhat equivalent to mermen, oddly resembling the Creature from the Black Lagoon).
The Taonggoy Tribe - A group of cannibals encountered by the Pugad Baboy Gang during their trip to Lubang Island. They claim to be an ethnic tribe undiscovered by anthropologists (an allusion to the Tasaday tribe). "Taonggoy" is a portmanteau of tao (human) and unggoy (ape).
Sendong Langib (General Cresendo Lagumbay) - A strict general who first appeared in a strip series in Pugad Baboy 4 called Retraining. He used his reputation as a cover for an illegal pedophile smuggling operation he runs deep in the Mt. Makulot retraining ground. This was stopped by Tomas, Ka Noli, and Robin Hound and the General was arrested. Lagumbay was released years later to form a security guard recruitment agency and teamed up with Violeta Kainam during the "terrorist scare" period.
Ka Damuseyn (first name never mentioned) - He is technically not a villain, but a spoof of Saddam Hussein during the Pugad Baboy Gang's trip to Bangui, Ilocos. He claims the rights to a plot of land where a malunggay tree owned by Ka Kwate, Ka Noli's comrade, is planted. The struggle to reclaim his plot became known as The Malunggay Conflict.
Devlino (Mang Danilo, surname never mentioned) - The leader of the supernatural entities that reside around the village of Dueñas, Iloilo. He poses as a faith healer who once treated Bab of his drug addiction. He failed to have the Pugad Baboy gang in his "smorgasborg" so Lucifer turned him into a poisonous mushroom. He also appears during the online story arc,"Ang Punyal ni Devlino" as the main priest, turned WPG's rat in Lucy's legion.
Anton Damien - Atong Damuho's descendant in 2078. He continues his great-grandfather's profession by smuggling drugs, as overseen by him and his three clones, Adam Carlo, Adam Alfred, and Adam Berto.
Cassius "G.I." Jones - A rogue sailor from the US Navy who went AWOL to form a white slavery syndicate in Olongapo. He was arrested by Judge Tickolas Marshall (another spoof of Polgas spoofing Judge Nicholas Marshall) and was sentenced to death "in any way possible".
Colonel Magti - The police chief who, seeing the low "revenue" acquired from their activities, initiates "Oplan Paglalanse". The Walang Payat Gang or WPG (No Thin Persons Gang), composed of Utoy, Joma, Paltik and Polgas, punished Magti's precinct for their acts of law mismanagement and corruption. One of his prime motivations was to support his four wives and eighteen children.
Col. Manyakis (Lt. Col. Violeta Kainam) - A female officer who became Tomas' boss. Initially, she seemed to lecherously have the hots for him. She's actually using him as a frame-up for her bank robbery/account fraud scheme. After recovering from a concussion she had when Tomas tried to expose her, she teamed up with General Lagumbay years later to aid on his security recruitment agency. Manyakis is the Tagalog corruption of maniac, used to connote an extremely lusty person (a sexual maniac).
Jonas (Jose Ignacio) - A former OFW (Overseas Filipino Worker) and leader of a doomsday cult whose actual purpose was to extort cash and belongings from his rich juvenile followers. Imitating the infamous suicide rite cliché performed by the Heaven's Gate cult, Jonas tries to persuade his initiates to drink contaminated water (instead of Kool-Aid laced with cyanide) to die from severe diarrhea.
Luna ("King Louie" Lupito Nakpil) - During President Ferdinand Marcos' regime, Louie Nakpil was a rich customs inspector. When he was investigated for his "unexplained wealth" during the EDSA Revolution, Nakpil rushed to his Tagaytay estate to hide. He was considered missing in action until he rose to piracy, joining with the Red Marlin gang, a group of Muslim petty pirates. He once had a golden retriever named Cecilia (Polgas's mother). He appeared primarily in the graphic novel Pirata.
Mr. Chan (Chien Jie Yao) - A Kung Fu master and restaurant owner who trains Bab (aka Bruce Swine, Babman The Pork Knight) in the ways of the Stoned Dragon Kung Fu technique. Chan desires to acquire Philippine land but is prohibited to purchase, so he relies on a local aristocrat named Doña Fe to legally own them. His signature move is the Three Stooges-esque poke-in-the-eye (which he innocently doubles as a peace sign). Mr. Chan spoofs David Carradine's Shaolin master in the TV series Kung Fu. This is shown by his restaurant's name, "Shaolin Temple", and Bab is called "Grass-smoker", just as Carradine's character Kwai Chang Caine was nicknamed "Grasshopper". More broadly, Mr. Chan could be a parody of Batman's actual Asian trainers in DC Comics. He was decapitated upon arrest. He along with the Doña, was part of a conspiracy against both squatters and landowners.
Agent Echo a.k.a. Helga (Eliseo) - Polgas' fellow canine OCB agent who runs a "magic mushroom" breeding operation deep within Mt. Arayat, Pampanga. He was exposed and was fired from the OCB.
"Nap and Alex Ang" ("Napoleon and Alexander Ang") - a pair of jueteng lord brothers in Bulacan disguised as the Chinese-Filipino identical twins who are import-export traders. The fake pair wanted to bring Rudolf Cruz, their accountant, killed, which was why they hired Igno. Rudolf later revealed to Igno that the Nap and Alex Ang who hired him were not the real ones as the real ones speak Filipino with a Chinese accent (the fake brothers speak Filipino fluently). The fake Nap Ang further revealed during Rudolf and Igno's incarceration that he and his brother switched identities with the real twins in Thailand. Nap was shot by Rudolf using a pipe and the bullet the former sent to the latter; he was taken to the hospital to remove the bullet. Alex, on the hand, was last seen washing his hands after handling Rudolf, who happens to be gay; it was presumed that he was arrested along with his goons. The real names of the fake Ang twins were never mentioned. The Angs (the real twins) are Chinese immigrants to the Philippines; they named themselves after Napoleon Bonaparte and Alexander the Great as they believed that they are descendants of a Chinese emperor.

References
Each item in this list pertains to the section or story arc in which the guise is found within a compilation followed by the name of the compilation itself.

Pugad Baboy
Pugad Baboy, Villains